Richard Curtis  "Richie" Davis is a retired American defensive back who played for the Montreal Alouettes of the Canadian Football League in 1970. He was part of their Grey Cup championship team.

Davis was drafted by the Detroit Lions but was cut and came to Canada. Playing 11 games with Montreal in 1970 he had six interceptions and was key part of the team's playoff drive. He broke his jaw in the final game of the season and was replaced by Bobby Lee Thompson for the playoffs.

External links
1970 GREY CUP ENGRAVING
CFLAPEDIA BIO
FANBASE BIO

1945 births
Living people
Sportspeople from Plainfield, New Jersey
Players of American football from New Jersey
Montreal Alouettes players
Upsala Vikings football players
Canadian football defensive backs